The Theban Tomb TT210, part of the Theban Necropolis, is located in  Deir el-Medina, on the west bank of the Nile, opposite to Luxor. TT210 is the burial place of the ancient Egyptian artisan named Raweben, who lived during the 19th Dynasty. Raweben would have lived in Deir el-Medina during the reign of Ramesses II.

Family
Raweben was the son of the sculptor of the Place of Truth named Piay and his wife Nefertkau. Raweben's brother Ipuy (TT217) is also depicted in the tomb, together with Ipuy's sons Nebnakht and Huy. Ḥe was married to the Lady of the house Nebtiunu. They are shown in the tomb accompanied by their sons Huy and Ramose and their daughters Hent-wedjebet, Tahaynu and Raia.

Tomb
On the lintel of the entrance Raweben and his wife and children are shown on one side before Osiris, Isis, Horus, Hathor and Ptah. On the other side of the lintel Raweben's father Piay, his brother Ipuy, his mother Nofretkau and others are shown worshipping Re-Harakhti, Ptah-Sokar, Hathor, and Amenhotep I and his mother Queen Ahmose Nefertari.

On the entrance there are balancing scenes on the outer jambs. On one side Raweben and his family are mentioned in a hetep di nesu offering, while his brother Ipuy and his family are mentioned on the other side.

Other objects
 Limestone stela of Qenemkhopshef, begotten by Raweben offering to Re-Harakhty. The text gives a prayer on behalf of Raweben to Re-Harakhty. (British Museum: BM 320) 
 Limestone offering table of Raweben (referred to as Rauben on the British Museum website) (British Museum: BM 593)
 Limestone offering table of Raweben with dedications to Amenhotep I and Ahmose Nefertari (British Museum: BM 594)
 Architrave fragment now in the Turin Museum (N.50185)

See also
 List of Theban tombs

References

Theban tombs
Nineteenth Dynasty of Egypt